Ali Mustafa (born 30 October 1995) is a Pakistani cricketer. He made his first-class debut for Lahore Blues in the 2017–18 Quaid-e-Azam Trophy on 15 December 2017. He made his List A debut for Lahore Blues in the 2017–18 Regional One Day Cup on 27 January 2018.

References

External links
 

1995 births
Living people
Pakistani cricketers
Place of birth missing (living people)
Lahore Blues cricketers